Aethionema saxatile, the burnt candytuft, is a species of flowering plant in the family Brassicaceae.
It is found in the European Alps.

References

External links

saxatile